Akte may refer to:
Mount Athos, a mountain in northern Greece, known as Akte in Classical times
Akte, a Maya archaeological site near Lake Petén Itzá in northern Guatemala